Andrea Maccoppi (born 22 January 1987) is an Italian footballer who plays as a midfielder for Swiss club Lugano II on loan from  Chiasso.

Club career
On 13 July 2022, Maccoppi joined Lugano II on a two-season loan.

References

1987 births
Footballers from Milan
Living people
Italian footballers
Association football midfielders
Piacenza Calcio 1919 players
Calcio Lecco 1912 players
S.S.D. Varese Calcio players
U.S. Pergolettese 1932 players
FC Locarno players
FC Vaduz players
FC Chiasso players
FC Lausanne-Sport players
Servette FC players
Serie B players
Swiss Super League players
Swiss Challenge League players
Swiss Promotion League players
Swiss 1. Liga (football) players
Italian expatriate footballers
Expatriate footballers in Switzerland
Italian expatriate sportspeople in Switzerland
Expatriate footballers in Liechtenstein
Italian expatriate sportspeople in Liechtenstein